1952 Hesburgh, provisional designation , is a rare-type carbonaceous asteroid from the outer regions of the asteroid belt, approximately 37 kilometers in diameter.

It was discovered on 3 May 1951, by IU's Indiana Asteroid Program at Goethe Link Observatory near Brooklyn, Indiana, United States. It was named for Father Theodore M. Hesburgh.

Orbit and classification 

Hesburgh orbits the Sun in the outer main-belt at a distance of 2.7–3.6 AU once every 5 years and 6 months (2,005 days). Its orbit has an eccentricity of 0.14 and an inclination of 14° with respect to the ecliptic. The body's observation arc begins at Goethe, five days after its official discovery observation.

Physical characteristics

Lightcurve 

In March 2005, a rotational lightcurve of Hesburgh was obtained from photometric observations by American astronomer Brian Warner at his Palmer Divide Observatory in Colorado. Lightcurve analysis gave a longer-than average rotation period of 47.7 hours with a brightness variation of at least 0.18 magnitude.

Spectral type 

In the Tholen taxonomy, Hesburgh is a rare CD: spectral type, an intermediary between the common carbonaceous C-type asteroid and the dark D-type asteroid, which is typical among the Jupiter trojans beyond the main-belt. Another asteroid with a CD:-type is 691 Lehigh.

Diameter and albedo 

According to the surveys carried out by the Infrared Astronomical Satellite IRAS, the Japanese Akari satellite, and NASA's Wide-field Infrared Survey Explorer with its subsequent NEOWISE mission, Hesburgh measures between 32.39 and 41.27 kilometers in diameter and its surface has an albedo between 0.078 and 0.1041. The Collaborative Asteroid Lightcurve Link adopts the results obtained by IRAS, that is, an albedo of 0.1041 and a diameter of 35.55 kilometers with an absolute magnitude of 10.32.

Naming 

This minor planet was named after American Theodore M. Hesburgh (1917–2015), a priest and president of the University of Notre Dame in Notre Dame, Indiana. He was also a member of the National Science Board and played a decisive role for the founding of the Kitt Peak National Observatory, as well as of the Chilean Cerro Tololo Interamerican Observatory during the 1960s. The approved naming citation was published by the Minor Planet Center on 1 January 1981.

Notes

References

External links 
 Asteroid Lightcurve Database (LCDB), query form (info )
 Dictionary of Minor Planet Names, Google books
 Asteroids and comets rotation curves, CdR – Observatoire de Genève, Raoul Behrend
 Discovery Circumstances: Numbered Minor Planets (1)-(5000) – Minor Planet Center
 
 

001952
001952
Named minor planets
001952
19510503